Teledyne FLIR LLC, formerly FLIR Systems Inc, (an acronym for "forward-looking infrared"), a subsidiary of Teledyne Technologies, specializes in the design and production of thermal imaging cameras and sensors. Its main customers are governments and in 2020, approximately 31% of its revenues were from the federal government of the United States and its agencies.

Operations
FLIR produces devices for the following markets:
 Surveillance and reconnaissance
 Force protection
 Border and maritime patrol
 Critical infrastructure protection
 Search and rescue
 Detection 
 Targeting
 Airborne law enforcement
 Drug interdiction

Facilities
The company has offices, manufacturing, and/or research and development facilities in Nashua, New Hampshire; Goleta, California; North Billerica, Massachusetts; Orlando, Florida; Bozeman, Montana; Stillwater, Oklahoma; Arlington County, Virginia; Chelmsford, Massachusetts; Ventura, California; Elkridge, Maryland; Freeport, Pennsylvania; Oak Ridge, Tennessee; Waterloo, Ontario; West Lafayette, Indiana; Tallinn; Täby; Dubai; Hvalstad; and Fareham.

Products

FLIR One
The FLIR ONE camera is limited to 9 frames per second due to United States regulatory concerns. The camera can be used to detect water and air leaks. It is available as an add-on for Android and iOS devices.

AN/PVS-22
The AN/PVS-22, designated as the Universal Night Sight (UNS) is  a clip-on night vision sight built off FLIR's MilSight 105 scope. The UNS can be used to engage long-range targets and can handle recoil up to .50BMG. The AN/PVS-22 was originally co-designed by Knight's Armament Company and OSTI Inc. for SOCOM. Ownership of the tradename "Universal Night Sight" was fought over by KAC and OSTI. It is uncertain how FLIR came to own the rights for the AN/PVS-22 and MilSight 105 design.

History

The company was founded as FLIR Systems in 1978 to pioneer the development of high-performance, low-cost infrared (thermal) imaging systems for airborne uses.

Originally based in Tigard, Oregon, the company relocated to Portland, Oregon, in the mid-1990s.

In 1990, the company acquired the industrial infrared imaging group of Hughes Aircraft Company.

In June 1993, the company became a public company via an initial public offering, raising $12 million.

In January 1998, the company acquired Agema Infrared System of Sweden for approximately $80 million.

In January 1999, J. Kenneth Stringer III was named President & CEO of the company.

In April 1999, the company acquired Inframetrics.

In May 2000, Stringer was fired by the board of directors due to errors in the company's accounting practices, Earl Lewis replaced Stringer as President & CEO of the company, and PricewaterhouseCoopers was dismissed as auditor. In January 2001, FLIR agreed to pay $6 million to settle class-action shareholder litigation and FLIR settled with the U.S. Securities and Exchange Commission in October 2002. Three executives were charged with fraudulent accounting.

In 2004, the company acquired a building in Wilsonville, Oregon, from Mentor Graphics for $10.3 million for use as a new headquarters.

In January 2004, FLIR acquired Indigo Systems, a developer and supplier of infrared imaging products, including cooled and uncooled infrared detectors, camera cores, and finished cameras, for $190 million. In 2011, after losing a trade secrets claim against the founders of Indigo Systems, FLIR agreed to pay $39 million to settle a countersuit.

Beginning in 2005, the company began supplying BMW with imaging technology for use on its vehicles.

In March 2007, the company reported that it would restate its financial statements for the period from 1995 to 2005 due to options backdating. FLIR had been sued by investors for options backdating but the lawsuits were thrown out in November 2007.

In October 2007, the company acquired Extech Instruments for $40 million.

In April 2008, the company acquired Ifara Tecnologias of Spain for €7.0 million.

In December 2009, it sold Extech Data Systems, a division of Extech which made portable printers.

Also in December 2009, the company acquired security hardware maker Directed Perception for $20 million.

In May 2010, the company acquired bankrupt Raymarine for $180 million.

In December 2012, the company acquired Lorex Technology for $60 million. Lorex was sold to Dahua Technology in 2018 for $29 million.

In May 2013, Andrew C. Teich was appointed President & CEO after the retirement of Earl Lewis.

In April 2015, the company paid $9.5 million to settle allegations of violations of the Foreign Corrupt Practices Act after it paid for a world tour for Saudi Arabian officials. According to the U.S. Securities and Exchange Commission, FLIR earned more than $7 million in profits from sales influenced by the FCPA violations.

In November 2015, the company acquired DVTEL, a provider of software and hardware technologies for advanced video surveillance, for approximately $92 million in cash.

In February 2016, the company's technology was used by Bullitt Group and Caterpillar Inc. in a mobile phone that uses its lightweight thermal imaging technology.

In November 2016, FLIR acquired Point Grey Research, owner of the Brickstream brand of camera products, for $259 million.

In December 2016, FLIR acquired Prox Dynamics, the makers of the Black Hornet Nano, a nano-drone used by the military and law enforcement for surveillance and reconnaissance, for $134 million.

In May 2017, Jim Cannon was appointed President & CEO of the company.

In January 2019, the company acquired Aeryon Labs for $200 million.

In March 2019, the company acquired Endeavor Robotics, the former iRobot division responsible for unmanned ground vehicles (UGVs) for the global military, public safety, and critical infrastructure markets, for $382 million in cash. The company also opened a second headquarters in Arlington County, Virginia.

In October 2019, the company acquired patents related to tethered drones, which are connected to the ground with a cable and can stay aloft much longer than drones powered by batteries, from Aria Insights.

In April 2020, during the COVID-19 pandemic, the company released a thermal camera that can be used to identify elevated skin temperature. Demand for these products surged, putting stress on the company's supply chain.

In January 2021, Teledyne Technologies announced that it had entered into a definitive agreement to acquire the company for $8 billion, against FLIR's 2019 revenue of $1.9 billion. The acquisition was completed in May 2021, and FLIR Systems Inc. continued as Teledyne FLIR LLC.

Mentionable Use Cases of Products
In 2017, the company partnered with the WWF's Wildlife Crime Technology Project, an initiative supported by a $5 million grant from Google. FLIR cameras were deployed in several game preserves in Namibia, Kenya, South Africa, Malawi and Zimbabwe. The program's thermal cameras, along with drones, digital tracking systems and other technology, was used to prevent poaching.

On October 4, 2022, the company announced that NASA will use its thermal LWIR camera module, the Boson, in its design of an inflatable re-entry heat shield.

On October 25, 2022, the company was awarded $48.7 million (USD) to provide Maritime Forward Looking Infared (MARFLIR) II sensors and variants of the SeaFLIR 280-HD surveillance systems to the United States Coast Guard.

See also
 List of companies based in Oregon

References

External links
 

1978 establishments in Oregon
1993 initial public offerings
2021 mergers and acquisitions
American companies established in 1978
American corporate subsidiaries
Avionics companies
Companies based in Wilsonville, Oregon
Companies formerly listed on the Nasdaq
Defense companies of the United States
Electronics companies established in 1978
Manufacturing companies based in Oregon
Teledyne Technologies
Video surveillance companies